Listh Saumedhe (born Don Marasinghe Arachchilage Listh Saumedhe on 11 June 1981) was a Sri Lankan cricketer. He was a left-handed batsman and a left-arm medium-fast bowler who played for Bloomfield Cricket and Athletic Club. He was born in Colombo.

Saumedhe made a single first-class appearance for the side, during the 2000–01 season, against Tamil Union Cricket and Athletic Club. From the opening order, he scored 9 runs in the first innings in which he batted, and 11 not out in the second innings.

Saumedhe bowled five overs in the match, taking two wickets.

External links
Listh Saumedhe at CricketArchive 

1981 births
Living people
Sri Lankan cricketers
Bloomfield Cricket and Athletic Club cricketers